Long Shot is a 2019 American romantic comedy film directed by Jonathan Levine and written by Dan Sterling and Liz Hannah. The plot follows a journalist (Seth Rogen) who reunites with his former babysitter (Charlize Theron), now the United States Secretary of State. O'Shea Jackson Jr., Andy Serkis, June Diane Raphael, Bob Odenkirk, and Alexander Skarsgård also star.

The film had its world premiere at South by Southwest on March 9, 2019, and was theatrically released in the United States on May 3, 2019 by Lionsgate. It received generally positive reviews and praise for the chemistry between Rogen and Theron, but underperformed at the box office.

Plot
U.S. Secretary of State Charlotte Field learns from President Chambers, a former television actor, that he does not plan on running for a second term as he is trying to break into the movie industry. Seeing an opportunity, she convinces him to endorse her as a potential presidential candidate.

Meanwhile, New York City journalist Fred Flarsky learns that the newspaper he works for has been bought by Parker Wembley, a wealthy media mogul whose politics directly oppose Fred's. Furious, he promptly quits but cannot find another job. Depressed, he turns to his more successful best friend Lance, who takes him to a charity fundraising event where Boyz II Men are performing. Coincidentally, Charlotte is also there. She and Fred recognize each other, as she was his babysitter and secret crush when they were young. While they catch up, Wembley interrupts them to plan a meeting with Charlotte, leading Fred to loudly condemn Wembley before he storms off and falls down a flight of stairs in front of everyone.

Charlotte reads some of Fred's columns and decides to hire him as a speechwriter, over the protests of her chief of staff, Maggie. Fred voices his skepticism of Charlotte's true commitment to important issues, but takes the job. At a world leaders' summit, Charlotte is forced to revise a speech about an environmental campaign to appease industrialists. When Fred calls her out on abandoning her morals (threatening to quit then and there if she goes through with the changed speech), she changes her mind and gives the original speech, which is enthusiastically received.

As the two continue to spend time together under the pretext of Fred learning more about Charlotte for his writing, they grow closer. When they survive a revolution in Manila, they begin a relationship. When Maggie finds out, she warns Charlotte and Fred that the public will never accept them as a couple. When Chambers, under pressure from Wembley, orders Charlotte to remove her plans to preserve the trees, she lets off steam by getting high on ecstasy with Fred. A hostage crisis occurs and, still under the drug's influence, Charlotte has a surprisingly frank talk with the captors and frees the hostage.

Even though the incident increases Charlotte's approval rating, Chambers is livid when she chooses to ignore his orders and call him out. He confronts her in his office alongside Wembley, who has a vested interest in removing the trees as part of his plan. The two blackmail her with a hacked video from Fred's webcam. The hacked video depicts Fred discussing his and Charlotte's relationship and Fred further masturbating to a video of one of her speeches, the hacked video culminating in Fred ejaculating on his own face. Charlotte shows Fred the hacked video and informs him that she has agreed to the ultimatum, and that she wants to introduce him and their relationship publicly once his image is cleaned up. Disappointed and unwilling to change, he refuses and they break up.

Back in New York, Fred talks with Lance. Lance comes out to Fred as a Republican and a Christian. Fred's reaction is initially racist, not believing that African Americans can be Republican, and assuming that the only reason Lance wears a cross is as a black cultural symbol. Lance tells him that he has been too stubborn with his principles and refusal to consider other people's needs and opinions. Fred decides to accede to Charlotte's ideas.

However, during her announcement to run for president in 2020, Charlotte changes her mind and opts for her original plan, also revealing the blackmail from Wembley and Chambers and describing the content of the video before its release. The video is released and Fred is nicknamed "cum guy" by the news media. Fred searches for Charlotte and finds her waiting at his apartment. They admit that they love each other, and meet the press outside where Charlotte introduces Fred as her boyfriend, with the public surprisingly being supportive of them. In 2021, the couple marry and Charlotte is sworn in as the first female president with Fred as "First Mister", him having taken her last name.

Cast 
 Seth Rogen as Fred Flarsky, an unemployed journalist
 Braxton Herda as Young Fred
 Charlize Theron as Charlotte Field, the U.S. Secretary of State
 Aviva Mongillo as Young Charlotte
 O'Shea Jackson Jr. as Lance, Fred's best friend
 Andy Serkis as Parker Wembley, an international media mogul 
 June Diane Raphael as Maggie Millikin, one of Field's two key staffers
 Bob Odenkirk as President Chambers, the President of the United States and a former television actor 
 Alexander Skarsgård as James Steward, the Prime Minister of Canada
 Ravi Patel as Tom, one of Field's two key staffers
 Randall Park as Flarsky's boss 
 Tristan D. Lalla as Agent M, Field's bodyguard
 James Saito as Minister Kishido
 Lisa Kudrow as Katherine, the head of Field's polling team
 Kurt Braunohler as Wembley News Anchor #1
 Paul Scheer as Wembley News Anchor #2
 Claudia O'Doherty as Wembley News Anchor #3
 Boyz II Men as themselves
 Lil Yachty as himself

Production

Development
Screenwriter Dan Sterling, who around the early 2010s was working for several TV shows, decided to take a break from that field and wanted to pursue a screenwriting career. The script, then titled Flarsky, described by producer Evan Goldberg as "a romantic comedy in the vein of Pretty Woman", had been floating around at Point Grey Pictures since its formation, at the time of production on The Green Hornet. Seth Rogen loved the script and wanted to make the film with Charlize Theron; according to him, it took about "7 years to get popular enough to work with her". Theron eventually agreed to do the film due to her eagerness to work with Rogen. Not only did Theron star and produce the movie, but she also helped out Sterling touch up on her character Charlotte. When director Jonathan Levine came on board as director, he wanted to make a film as a callback to romantic comedies of the 1980s, like Tootsie and When Harry Met Sally.... Since the initial draft of the script was written in the early 2010s and the film deals primarily with current political issues, the crew brought in The Post screenwriter Liz Hannah, whose first Hollywood job was at Theron's production company Denver and Delilah Productions, to help polish up and update the script. They even brought in other consultants to help give more authenticity to the script.

Pre-production
In February 2017, the project was announced, with Rogen and Theron attached to star and Levine directing. Rogen was reportedly paid $15 million. In October 2017, O'Shea Jackson Jr. was cast. In November 2017, June Diane Raphael, Ravi Patel, Andy Serkis, Alexander Skarsgård, and Randall Park joined the cast as filming commenced in Montreal.

Filming
Scenes were filmed in Plaza de la Trinidad in Cartagena, Colombia in the end of January 2018. In January 2019, it was announced the film had been retitled Long Shot.

Music
Marco Beltrami and Miles Hankins composed the film's score, having previously worked with the director on The Night Before. Lionsgate Records has released the soundtrack.

Release
The film had its world premiere at South by Southwest on March 9, 2019. Originally slated to be released on February 8, 2019, following highly positive test screenings it was pushed back to June 7, 2019, in order to be positioned as a summer tentpole. It was then moved up to its eventual date of May 3, 2019.

While promoting the movie in France on the hit TV show Touche pas à mon poste!, Charlize Theron was shocked when the host Cyril Hanouna gave a friendly kiss to the female translator, not knowing that Hanouna kisses all his staff and collaborators, both men and women, on camera on a daily basis and that kissing is not frowned upon in France as it is in the US. The event briefly turned viral in France, where Hanouna is a household name. The vast majority of viewers defended Hanouna, as well as the cast of the show who felt Theron had totally misinterpreted his intentions. A few days later, the translator also said that she did not feel the kiss was inappropriate. Hanouna later swore never to invite Theron again.

Reception

Box office
Long Shot grossed $30.3 million in the United States and Canada, and $22.5 million in other territories, for a worldwide total of $52.9 million.

In the United States and Canada, Long Shot was released alongside The Intruder and UglyDolls, and was projected to gross $9–16 million from 3,230 theaters in its opening weekend. The film made $3.6 million on its first day, including $660,000 from Thursday night previews. It went on to debut to $9.7 million, finishing third. The film held well in its second weekend, grossing $6.1 million and finishing in fifth. The Ringer reported that the film underperformed at the box office, which it partially attributed to its premiere one week after the blockbuster success of Avengers: Endgame.

Critical response
The website's critical consensus reads, "A sharp and deceptively layered comedy that's further fueled by the odd couple chemistry of its leads, this Long Shot largely hits its marks." On Metacritic, it has a weighted average score of 67 out of 100, based on 45 critics, indicating "generally favorable reviews." Audiences polled by CinemaScore gave the film an average grade of "B" on an A+ to F scale, while those at PostTrak gave it 3.5 out of 5 stars and a 57% "definite recommend."

John DeFore of The Hollywood Reporter called it "Very funny whatever you think of its more old-fashioned notions, the picture will charm many viewers who can set implausibility aside for a while." Varietys Peter Debruge described the film as: "More creepy than romantic, more chauvinist than empowered — and in all fairness, funnier and more entertaining than any comedy in months — Long Shot serves up the far-fetched wish-fulfillment fantasy of how, for one lucky underdog, pursuing your first love could wind up making you first man."

References

External links 
 
 

2010s English-language films
2010s American films
2010s feminist films
2019 romantic comedy films
American political comedy films
American romantic comedy films
American feminist films
Films about elections
Films about fictional presidents of the United States
Films about journalists
Films directed by Jonathan Levine
Films produced by Charlize Theron
Films produced by Seth Rogen
Films produced by Evan Goldberg
Films shot in Colombia
Films shot in Montreal
Films set in 1991
Films set in 2019
Films set in 2021
Films set in Barcelona
Films set in Brooklyn
Films set in Colombia
Films set in Hanoi
Films set in Lisbon
Films set in Manila
Films set in Moscow
Films set in Stockholm
Films set in Washington, D.C.
Lionsgate films
Point Grey Pictures films
Summit Entertainment films